The first Comic Relief Does Fame Academy took place on 7 March 2003 and lasted until Red Nose Day on 14 March, where the final show was presented and the winner was announced. It was hosted by Patrick Kielty and Cat Deeley. Nine British celebrities moved into the Fame Academy. Will Mellor was the eventual winner of the sho

Contestants

Teachers
Most of the original Fame Academy teachers were back, including Richard Park, Carrie Grant, and Kevin Adams. David Grant was a newcomer, as a second voice coach.

Format
The same elimination mechanism as the 2002 series, with the teachers putting three on 'probation' each night, with the public saving one and the students the second.

Semi-final Twist
However, in the 'semi-final' with only three students left the producers decided to change the student vote to include all expelled students as well as the contestant saved by the public. Will, who was saved by the public, voted to save Kwame, while all six of the expelled students voted to save Ruby, changing the lineup of the final two.

Results and elimination

 Indicates the winning contestant
 Indicates the contestant who was eliminated from the competition
 Indicates the contestant who was the Grade A student for the week
 Indicates a contestant who was safe, and was neither the Grade A student or facing probation
 Indicates a contestant who faced probation, but was saved by the public vote.
 Indicates a contestant who faced probation, but was saved by their fellow students
 Indicates a contestant who was unable to perform at the live show
 Indicates a contestant who was not eliminated from the show, but had to withdraw due to illness
 Indicates that the contestant had been eliminated from the show, and was no longer competing at the academy.

Notes:
 Note 1: In the launch show, all contestants faced the public vote, the two with the fewest votes were put on probation and then faced the contestants vote.
 Note 2: Four contestants were put on probation instead of the usual three, with the public saving two.
 Note 3: All four remaining contestants were put on probation with the public saving two.
 Note 4: All three finalists faced probation with the public saving just one, the eliminated contestants returned to participate in the student vote.

External links

British reality television series
2003 British television series debuts
Comic Relief
Fame Academy
2003 British television seasons